Fri is a common abbreviation of Friday.

Fri or FRI may also refer to:
 Fri (yacht), involved in anti-nuclear protests
 Fri – En samling, a 2001 album by Kikki Danielsson
 Family Research Institute, US
 Forest Research Institute (disambiguation)
 Fractionation Research Inc., researching  distillation systems
 Fulmer Research Institute, a UK R&D organization (1945-1990)
 Icelandic Athletic Federation
 Left Revolutionary Front (Bolivia)
 The Norwegian Organisation for Sexual and Gender Diversity